The Swedish Academy for Children's Books is a nonprofit society, established on 26 May 1989 at the Skärholmen Library in Stockholm, Sweden. Based on the Swedish Academy, its ambitions is to promote children's and youth literature.

Since 1990, the society awards the Eldsjälen Award.

References

External links
 official website 

1989 establishments in Sweden
Swedish children's literature
Organizations based in Stockholm
Organizations established in 1989
Learned societies of Sweden